Murphy is a town in the General López Department of the Santa Fe Province, Argentina.

It is named after an Irishman, John James Murphy, from Haysland, near Kilrane, County Wexford, close to Rosslare Harbour. Born in 1822 into a Catholic family, Murphy was an unmarried son of middle-class tenant farmers, who decided to emigrate to better his prospects. He sailed to Buenos Aires then headed to the pampas to find farm work. Murphy initially found employment digging boundary ditches to separate neighbouring sheep farms, became a tenant sheep farmer, then acquired land of his own in the Salto area. He expanded his holdings and later acquired huge tracts of land in the vicinity of Rojas, Buenos Aires and later in Santa Fe Province. By the time of his death in 1909 he was hugely wealthy. In 1911, the expansion of the railway system led to the compulsory purchase of land near Rosario, held by Murphy's heirs. Estación Murphy was established, and the town that grew up around the station was named Murphy in 1966.

Sports clubs
 Club Centro Recreativo Unión y Cultura
 Club Agrario Los Leones
 Social y Deportivo Murphy Football Club

Notable people
 Paulo Gazzaniga - goalkeeper for Girona FC on loan from Fulham F.C.
 Mauricio Pochettino - former football player and most recently head coach of Paris Saint-Germain F.C.

References

External links

 Municipal website

Populated places in Santa Fe Province
Populated places established in 1911